The Taiwan Agricultural Research institute is a research institute in Taiwan under the auspices of the Council of Agriculture.

History
The Taiwan Agricultural Research institute (TARI) was founded in 1895 by the Japanese colonial powers. It is under the Council of Agriculture.

Research

Watermelon 
TARI began to study watermelon in the 1950s and has developed numerous varieties.

Pineapple
TARI has engaged in significant pineapple breeding since the Japanese colonial period with the Tainung No. 1 being introduced in 1934. The variety Tainung No. 23 (bred from Tainung No. 19 and Tainung No. 21) smells like mangos and is well adapted to Taiwan’s environment.

Green onion
In 2019 TARI released a heat tolerant green onion variety intended to allow farmers in the south of Taiwan to produce green onions in the summer.

Sweet potato 
Research into the sweet potato at the Chiayi research station began in 1922.

Strawberry
The institute has developed a bruise resistant variety of strawberry called Tainung No. 1.

Facilities
 Chiayi Agricultural Experiment Station
 Fengshan Tropical Horticultural Experiment Branch

See also
 Agriculture in Taiwan
 Taiwan Banana Research Institute
 Taiwan Sugar Research Institute
 Tea Research and Extension Station
 World Vegetable Center

References

1895 establishments in Taiwan
Agricultural research institutes in Taiwan
Scientific organizations established in 1895